Grielum humifusum is a species of flowering plant in the family Neuradaceae.

References

Neuradaceae